Tiddler may refer to:

 A small fish, especially the three-spined stickleback
 Tiddler, the basic component of a TiddlyWiki

See also
 Tom Tiddler's Ground, children's game 
 Tom Tiddler's Ground, collaborative work by Charles Dickens
 Tiddly, a term in barbershop arranging
 Tittle
Tiddler the Story-telling Fish, children's book by Julia Donaldson and Axel Scheffler